Major Mackenzie West Terminal is a York Region Transit bus terminus on a site immediately north of Canada's Wonderland and immediately south of Cortellucci Vaughan Hospital in Vaughan, Ontario, Canada. The station partially opened on November 6, 2022, with the full opening scheduled for December 2022. It includes a passenger pick-up and drop-off area and a pedestrian and cycling underpass connection to Cortellucci Vaughan Hospital.

Bus service

Platform assignments
All routes are YRT.
Platform 9: 4 Major Mackenzie westbound, 760 Vaughan Mills/Wonderland 
Platform 10: 20 Jane northbound
Platform 11: 20 Jane southbound, 720 Hwy 407 Terminal/Wonderland
Platform 12: 4 Major Mackenzie eastbound, Mobility On-Request

Upon the terminal's full opening in December, YRT routes will be transferred to the east side of the terminal.

As part of its 2023 transit initiatives, YRT plans to extend route 165 - Weston to service the terminal.

References 

York Region Transit Terminals
Transport in Vaughan
Buildings and structures in Vaughan
Transport infrastructure completed in 2022
2022 establishments in Ontario